James Stephen Gee Ha ( born 26 December 1992), nicknamed Bullet, is an English-born Hong Kong professional footballer who plays as a striker and is currently a free agent.

He is a member of the Hong Kong national football team. He was awarded Best Youth Player of Hong Kong in the 2010–11 season and best midfielder of Hong Kong Premier League in the 2018–19 season.

Early life
Ha was born in Middlesbrough, England in 1992 into a family of English and Hongkongese heritage. Ha moved to Hong Kong where his Hongkongese father resided and grew up on Hong Kong Island at an early age.

Ha reportedly had always taken an interest in football, ever since a young age. He attended The Salvation Army Ann Wyllie Memorial School for primary education. And for high school education he attended St. Joseph's College for two years, but later transferred to St. Joan of Arc, but not for long. As Ha decided it was best to start year 12 at South Island School in 2009, in which he represented the school team as an attacking midfielder. During these years he was also selected by Hong Kong Schools Sports Federation football team for the 36th Asian Schools Football Championship.

Club career

Early career
James Ha had started playing for reserves matches of Kitchee since joining Kitchee academy in 2007. He left Kitchee academy to Shatin when he was 16, but he had no debut in the club. Ha entered Fourway Athletics a year later but did not have much success.

He joined HKFC before the 2010–11 season of Hong Kong First Division League. He made his first division debut on the opening match of Hong Kong FC drew NT Realty Wofoo Tai Po on 4 September 2010. In the League Cup game on 8 January 2011, he scored his first goal in formal match on the 19th-minute and Hong Kong FC defeated NT Realty Wofoo Tai Po by 2–1 lastly.

In January 2011, Kitchee signed James Ha with a 1.5-year-long contract after dealing with Hong Kong FC, but James Ha would continue to play in Hong Kong FC until the end of 2010–11 season.

Kitchee
While James Ha playing for youth tournament Mediterranean Cup as member of Kitchee's youth academy in Spain in April 2011, Paraguayan club Guaraní approached him about playing for them in the Paraguayan Primera Division. But he concerned about playing so far away from home and rejected the offer finally.

The first appearance of James Ha in Kitchee is the training match against Hong Kong national football team in Siu Sai Wan Sports Ground on 16 July 2011 for Kitchee and Hong Kong prepared 2011 Barclays Asia Trophy and 2014 FIFA World Cup qualification. His first formal appearance is in a semifinal match of 2011 Barclays Asia Trophy against Chelsea in Hong Kong Stadium on 27 July 2011. Ha was sent to the field on the 82nd-minute to replace Roberto Losada, and Kitchee lost the game by 4 goals.

After the rejection of Guaraní's offer and the postpone of Ha's university study, the new first division team for 2013 East Asian Games has founded and James was called up by the long-term training section. Kitchee general manager Ken Ng asserted in what a choice depended on Ha and head coach Josep Gombau and Ng would make a decision after summer training in Spain. Finally, although Ha did not be loaned to Hong Kong Sapling, he also has left Kitchee in the short term to study in United Kingdom.

Trials in Europe
In November 2011, while James Ha is in the United Kingdom playing for amateur side Salisbury City Academy#Reserves|reserve team]], which is owned by Hong Kong businessman Carson Yeung. Kitchee said it will not stand in his way if Yeung's Birmingham City decides to recruit him. On 8 November 2011, Birmingham City reserves lost to a couple of late goals in a private friendly at Wolverhampton Wanderers. James Ha made a substitute appearance.

James Ha went back to Hong Kong in January 2012 for Lunar New Year celebration and ended the two months training but Birmingham City abandoned him after the holidays. In accordance with Dani Cancela's suggestion, Kitchee sent Ha to Sevilla Atlético for further training. Lamentably, he went back to Hong Kong in early April 2012.

Back To Kitchee
After a year for academic study and trial in Europe, Kitchee general manager Ken Ng announced that James Ha would be back to Kitchee in 2012–13 season.

International career

2010–11
In 2010, the Hong Kong Football Association have decided to play James Ha in an age group above his age. Ha was just 17 when he played for the Hong Kong national under-23 football team at the exhibition matches against Guangdong under-23 team in 2010. His outstanding performance in those two exhibition matches gave rise to that he can be the regular player of Hong Kong under-23 team.

Ha was called up to the under-23 squad for the first formal game for their friendly against Chinese Taipei on 24 January 2011. He scored his under-23 international goal in the match two days later, which against Chinese Taipei too. For the first preliminary round of 2012 Summer Olympics against Maldives, he was sent to the field by head coach Tsang Wai Chung both two matches and he scored a total of four goals.

He was also named in the under-23 list squad for second preliminary round of 2012 Summer Olympics against Uzbekistan, but did not feature in the first leg at the Uzbek stadium, which lost by a goal. Before the second leg, some media in Hong Kong claimed that Ha was the 'secret weapon' of Hong Kong team. In the second leg, Hong Kong astonishingly opted defending formation and caused two losing goals to put Uzbekistan 2–0 up in 20 minutes. Ha replaced Au Yeung Yiu Chung in 34th-minute as winger and played as target man in second half. However, in a match in which Hong Kong were generally regarded as having underachieved and Uzbekistan won 3–0 on aggregate, he was widely considered one of the few successes of the Hong Kong under-23 squad.

2011–12
In August 2011, Hong Kong Football Association has formed the long-term training section for 2013 East Asian Games and Ha was selected by the association. For the preparing of the games, Ha would be sent to a new first division league team consisting of members of the training section. At last, Ha did not be listed by Hong Kong Sapling and stayed in Kitchee.

After the Europe trial of Ha, new Hong Kong national football team coach Ernie Merrick selected Ha for the friendlies against Singapore and Vietnam due to absent Chan Siu Ki and Godfred Karikari.

In June 2012, Ha was chosen by Merrick for under-23 team to 2014 AFC U-22 Asian Cup qualification in Laos. He played the opening match of the Hong Kong team as a substitute but Hong Kong lost the game by 2–3.

2017–18
Ha made his international debut for the national team on 5 October 2017, in a 4–0 friendly win over Laos.

Honours

Individual
 Best Youth Player: 2010–11

Career statistics

Club
As of 19 May 2021

1Including 2 games in 2012 Hong Kong–Shanghai Inter Club Championship.

International

Hong Kong U-23
As of 3 July 2012

Hong Kong

International goals
Scores and results list Hong Kong's goal tally first.

Personal life
Ha has lived on Hong Kong Island for a long time and he loves playing football for leisure in Victoria Park, Causeway Bay. He thinks there are many top players in Victoria Park and he learnt a lot of skills and sense of soccer in the park. Recently, Victoria Park is always closed for special events so he goes to the park in low frequency now. Besides football, Ha is a rugby union footballer, and won the HKFSS Inter-School Rugby Competition in 2011.

Ha is the owner of Scene 852 Productions, a new media company of creators in Hong Kong.

References

External links
 
 

1992 births
Living people
People from Middlesbrough
Hong Kong footballers
Hong Kong international footballers
English footballers
English people of Hong Kong descent
Hong Kong people of English descent
Association football wingers
Hong Kong FC players
Hong Kong Premier League players
Kitchee SC players
Sun Hei SC players
Southern District FC players